In probability theory and statistics, the cumulative distribution function (CDF) of a real-valued random variable , or just distribution function of , evaluated at , is the probability that  will take a value less than or equal to .

Cumulative distribution functions are also used to specify the distribution of multivariate random variables.

Definition
The cumulative distribution function of a real-valued random variable  is the function given by

The probability that  lies in the semi-closed interval , where , is therefore

In the definition above, the "less than or equal to" sign, "≤", is a convention, not a universally used one (e.g. Hungarian literature uses "<"), but the distinction is important for discrete distributions. The proper use of tables of the binomial and Poisson distributions depends upon this convention. Moreover, important formulas like Paul Lévy's inversion formula for the characteristic function also rely on the "less than or equal" formulation.

If treating several random variables  etc. the corresponding letters are used as subscripts while, if treating only one, the subscript is usually omitted. It is conventional to use a capital  for a cumulative distribution function, in contrast to the lower-case  used for probability density functions and probability mass functions.

The probability density function of a continuous random variable can be determined from the cumulative distribution function by differentiating using the Fundamental Theorem of Calculus; i.e. given ,

as long as the derivative exists.

The CDF of a continuous random variable  can be expressed as the integral of its probability density function  as follows:

In the case of a random variable  which has distribution having a discrete component at a value ,

Properties 

Every cumulative distribution function  is non-decreasing and right-continuous, which makes it a càdlàg function. Furthermore,

Every function with these four properties is a CDF, i.e., for every such function, a random variable can be defined such that the function is the cumulative distribution function of that random variable.

If  is a purely discrete random variable, then it attains values  with probability , and the CDF of  will be discontinuous at the points :

If the CDF  of a real valued random variable  is continuous, then  is a continuous random variable; if furthermore  is absolutely continuous, then there exists a Lebesgue-integrable function  such that

as shown in the diagram.

In particular, we have

Examples 
As an example, suppose  is uniformly distributed on the unit interval .

Suppose instead that  takes only the discrete values 0 and 1, with equal probability.

Suppose  is exponential distributed.

Here λ > 0 is the parameter of the distribution, often called the rate parameter.

Suppose  is normal distributed.

A table of the CDF of the standard normal distribution is often used in statistical applications, where it is named the standard normal table, the unit normal table, or the Z table.

Suppose  is binomial distributed.

Derived functions

Complementary cumulative distribution function (tail distribution)

Sometimes, it is useful to study the opposite question and ask how often the random variable is above a particular level.

This has applications in statistical hypothesis testing, for example, because the one-sided p-value is the probability of observing a test statistic at least as extreme as the one observed. Thus, provided that the test statistic, T, has a continuous distribution, the one-sided p-value is simply given by the ccdf: for an observed value  of the test statistic

In survival analysis,  is called the survival function and denoted , while the term reliability function is common in engineering.

Properties
 For a non-negative continuous random variable having an expectation, Markov's inequality states that 
 As , and in fact  provided that  is finite.  Proof:  Assuming  has a density function , for any   Then, on recognizing  and rearranging terms,  as claimed.
 For a random variable having an expectation,  and for a non-negative random variable the second term is 0.  If the random variable can only take non-negative integer values, this is equivalent to

Folded cumulative distribution

While the plot of a cumulative distribution  often has an S-like shape, an alternative illustration is the folded cumulative distribution or mountain plot, which folds the top half of the graph over, that is

where  denotes the indicator function and the second summand is the survivor function, thus using two scales, one for the upslope and another for the downslope. This form of illustration emphasises the median, dispersion (specifically, the mean absolute deviation from the median) and skewness of the distribution or of the empirical results.

Inverse distribution function (quantile function)

If the CDF F is strictly increasing and continuous then  is the unique real number  such that . This defines the inverse distribution function or quantile function.

Some distributions do not have a unique inverse (for example if  for all , causing  to be constant). In this case, one may use the generalized inverse distribution function, which is defined as

 Example 2: Put . Then we call  the 95th percentile.

Some useful properties of the inverse cdf (which are also preserved in the definition of the generalized inverse distribution function) are:

  is nondecreasing
 
 
  if and only if 
This is used in random number generation using the inverse transform sampling-method.

The inverse of the cdf can be used to translate results obtained for the uniform distribution to other distributions.

Empirical distribution function 
The empirical distribution function is an estimate of the cumulative distribution function that generated the points in the sample. It converges with probability 1 to that underlying distribution. A number of results exist to quantify the rate of convergence of the empirical distribution function to the underlying cumulative distribution function.

Multivariate case

Definition for two random variables
When dealing simultaneously with more than one random variable the joint cumulative distribution function can also be defined. For example, for a pair of random variables , the joint CDF  is given by

Example of joint cumulative distribution function:

For two continuous variables X and Y: 

For two discrete random variables, it is beneficial to generate a table of probabilities and address the cumulative probability for each potential range of X and Y, and here is the example:

given the joint probability mass function in tabular form, determine the joint cumulative distribution function.

Solution: using the given table of probabilities for each potential range of X and Y, the joint cumulative distribution function may be constructed in tabular form:

Definition for more than two random variables
For  random variables , the joint CDF  is given by

Interpreting the  random variables as a random vector  yields a shorter notation:

Properties
Every multivariate CDF is:
 Monotonically non-decreasing for each of its variables,
 Right-continuous in each of its variables,
 
 

Not every function satisfying the above four properties is a multivariate CDF, unlike in the single dimension case. It is easy to see that the above conditions are met, and yet  is not a CDF since if it was, then  as explained below.

The probability that a point belongs to a hyperrectangle is analogous to the 1-dimensional case:

Complex case

Complex random variable
The generalization of the cumulative distribution function from real to complex random variables is not obvious because expressions of the form  make no sense. However expressions of the form  make sense. Therefore, we define the cumulative distribution of a complex random variables via the joint distribution of their real and imaginary parts:

Complex random vector
Generalization of  yields

as definition for the CDS of a complex random vector .

Use in statistical analysis
The concept of the cumulative distribution function makes an explicit appearance in statistical analysis in two (similar) ways. Cumulative frequency analysis is the analysis of the frequency of occurrence of values of a phenomenon less than a reference value. The empirical distribution function is a formal direct estimate of the cumulative distribution function for which simple statistical properties can be derived and which can form the basis of various statistical hypothesis tests. Such tests can assess whether there is evidence against a sample of data having arisen from a given distribution, or evidence against two samples of data having arisen from the same (unknown) population distribution.

Kolmogorov–Smirnov and Kuiper's tests
The Kolmogorov–Smirnov test is based on cumulative distribution functions and can be used to test to see whether two empirical distributions are different or whether an empirical distribution is different from an ideal distribution. The closely related Kuiper's test is useful if the domain of the distribution is cyclic as in day of the week. For instance Kuiper's test might be used to see if the number of tornadoes varies during the year or if sales of a product vary by day of the week or day of the month.

See also
 Descriptive statistics
 Distribution fitting
 Ogive (statistics)

References

External links 
 

Functions related to probability distributions